Ilchester Museum is a small local museum in Ilchester, Somerset, England.

The museum is housed within the Ilchester Town Hall, which was built between 1812 and 1816, incorporating parts of a 17th-century building on the same site. In the 13th century it had been the site of the Shire Hall when Ilchester was the county town of Somerset, and it was used as a court house until 1843 and the County Gaol until 1846. It is a Grade II listed building.

The museum includes exhibits showing the history of the town from the Iron Age and Roman periods, when it was known as Lindinis, to the present day. These include the town's 13th-century mace or staff of office, bearing the insignia of Richard I; three kings and an angel, which is the oldest staff of office in England.

The collection also includes a full set of Maundy Money which was acquired in 1995.

The Town Hall and the Museum are run by the Ilchester Town Trust.

References

External links
 Ilchester Museum - Ilchester Parish Council

Museums in Somerset
Grade II listed buildings in South Somerset
History of Somerset
Local museums in Somerset
Grade II listed museum buildings